Narka is a city in Republic County, Kansas, United States.  As of the 2020 census, the population of the city was 81.

History
Narka was founded in 1887. It was named for the daughter of a railroad employee. The first post office in Narka was established in November 1887. Narka was incorporated as a city in 1894.

Geography
Narka is located at  (39.960229, -97.427351).

Demographics

2010 census
As of the census of 2010, there were 94 people, 42 households, and 25 families residing in the city. The racial makeup of the city was 100.0% White.

There were 42 households, of which 23.8% had children under the age of 18 living with them, 47.6% were married couples living together, 7.1% had a female householder with no husband present, 4.8% had a male householder with no wife present, and 40.5% were non-families. 38.1% of all households were made up of individuals, and 7.1% had someone living alone who was 65 years of age or older. The average household size was 2.24 and the average family size was 3.00.

The median age in the city was 40 years. 24.5% of residents were under the age of 18; 11.7% were between the ages of 18 and 24; 22.3% were from 25 to 44; 30.8% were from 45 to 64; and 10.6% were 65 years of age or older. The gender makeup of the city was 54.3% male and 45.7% female.

2000 census
As of the census of 2000, there were 93 people, 47 households, and 24 families residing in the city. The racial makeup of the city was 100.00% White.

There were 47 households, out of which 25.5% had children under the age of 18 living with them, 40.4% were married couples living together, 2.1% had a female householder with no husband present, and 48.9% were non-families. 44.7% of all households were made up of individuals, and 27.7% had someone living alone who was 65 years of age or older. The average household size was 1.98 and the average family size was 2.83.

In the city, the population was spread out, with 22.6% under the age of 18, 8.6% from 18 to 24, 22.6% from 25 to 44, 23.7% from 45 to 64, and 22.6% who were 65 years of age or older. The median age was 42 years. For every 100 females, there were 121.4 males. For every 100 females age 18 and over, there were 100.0 males.

The median income for a household in the city was $16,250, and the median income for a family was $21,250. Males had a median income of $28,750 versus $16,250 for females. The per capita income for the city was $11,693. There were 22.2% of families and 23.8% of the population living below the poverty line, including 15.8% of under eighteens and 37.5% of those over 64.

Education
The community is served by Republic County USD 109 public school district. It was formed in 2006 by the consolidation of Belleville USD 427 and Hillcrest USD 455. The Republic County High School mascot is Republic County Buffaloes.

Narka schools were closed through school unification. The Narka High School mascot was Narka Wildcats.

References

Further reading

External links
 Narka - Directory of Public Officials
 Narka city map, KDOT

Cities in Kansas
Cities in Republic County, Kansas